James Joseph (Seamus) Hughes (18 May 1881 – 23 January 1943) was an Irish trade unionist, revolutionary, composer, and public servant.

He was born near Mountjoy Square, Dublin, to James Hughes, a baker from County Offaly. His mother died of TB when he was six. He attended O'Connell School and spent time at a Dominican seminary in Voiron, France. He taught French in Newbridge College and was a clerk at a firm exporting eggs. He married Josephine Hackett from Milltown, Dublin in 1912; they had five children. He was in the Irish Republican Brotherhood and the Irish Socialist Republican Party, and with the Irish Citizen Army in Jacob's during the Easter Rising, subsequently imprisoned until May 1917. He was acting secretary of the ITGWU while Jim Larkin was in America, but was ousted by William O'Brien. He was arrested at Liberty Hall after Bloody Sunday 1920. He joined the Irish civil service under the 1922 Provisional Government and was the first secretary of Cumann na nGaedheal. He lost narrowly to Seán Lemass in a Dáil by-election in 1924. From 1925 he worked for 2RN, later Radio Éireann, becoming its director of programming in 1929. Frank Gallagher took most of his functions in 1935, leaving Hughes only Irish-language programming. During the Emergency he was transferred to censorship of post.

References

Further reading
 

1881 births
1943 deaths
Irish trade unionists
Cumann na nGaedheal politicians
Irish composers
RTÉ executives
Irish schoolteachers
Irish civil servants
Irish Citizen Army members
Musicians from Dublin (city)
Politicians from Dublin (city)